is a passenger railway station in located in the city of Maizuru, Kyoto Prefecture, Japan, operated by West Japan Railway Company (JR West).

Lines

Station layout
The station consists of two opposed side platform; each platform has a separate exit and passengers wishing to change platforms must exit the station. The station is unattended.

Platforms

Adjacent stations

History
Magura Station opened on September 1, 1951. With the privatization of the Japan National Railways (JNR) on April 1, 1987, the station came under the aegis of the West Japan Railway Company.

Passenger statistics
In fiscal 2016, the station was used by an average of 25 passengers daily (boarding passengers only)

Surrounding area
 Shitakeyama Kyokogataki Fudo Myoo
Kyoto Prefectural Maizuru Support School

See also
List of railway stations in Japan

References

External links

 Magura Station Official Site

Railway stations in Kyoto Prefecture
Railway stations in Japan opened in 1951
Maizuru